Dreamboatsafari is a studio album by the English multi-instrumentalist Duke Garwood. It was released by Fire Records on 25 January 2011.

Critical reception
NME wrote that "skeletal percussion is given the illusion of flesh under a covering of drones, scrapes and rusty emulations, and hearty burps from a leprous saxophone ... if it's the blues, it's a very Beefheart blues; which is, of course, the very best kind." The Oklahoma Gazette wrote that "the recording was done in a mid-fi way that plays up the fuzzy edges of the sound and ties in the outlier acoustic bits."

Track listing

Personnel
 Duke Garwood – vocals, guitar (1-3, 5–13), bass guitar (4, 10), bulbul tarang (13), horns (3), keyboards (4, 9), saxophone (8-9), piano (8)
 Neil May – bass guitar (5, 8, 11–12)
 Paul May – drums (2-3, 5–6, 8–13), percussion (13)

References

2011 albums
Duke Garwood albums
Fire Records (UK) albums